Shevchuk, Shewchuk, Schewchuk, Ševčuk, Sevcuk, Szewczuk, or Chevchuk is a widespread Ukrainian surname. It is derived from the Ukrainian word shvets, "cobbler/shoemaker", and the suffix -uk, denoting descent. It is also related to Shevchyk, a less common Ukrainian surname.

People

Shevchuk 
 Anatoliy Shevchuk (1954–2011), Ukrainian art historian
 Andrey Shevchuk (born 1970), Russian javelin thrower
 Andriy Shevchuk (born 1985), Ukrainian footballer
 Anton Shevchuk (born 1990), Ukrainian footballer
 Anzhelika Shevchuk (born 1969), Ukrainian sprinter
 Jason Shevchuk, American musician
 Serhiy Shevchuk (born 1985), Ukrainian footballer
 Serhiy Shevchuk (born 1990), Ukrainian footballer
 Stephan Shevchuk (born 1977), Russian sprint canoer
 Sviatoslav Shevchuk (born 1970), Ukrainian archbishop
 Taras Shevchuk (born 1997), Ukrainian track cyclist
 Vadym Shevchuk (born 1995), Ukrainian footballer
 Valeriy Shevchuk (born 1939), Ukrainian writer
 Vasyl Shevchuk (born 1954), Ukrainian politician
 Vladimir Shevchuk (born 1954), Russian footballer and manager
 Vyacheslav Shevchuk (born 1979), Ukrainian footballer
 Yulia Shevchuk (born 1998), Ukrainian footballer
 Yuri Shevchuk (born 1957), Russian musician
 Yuriy Shevchuk (born 1985), Ukrainian footballer
 Yevgeny Shevchuk (born 1968), Transnistria politician

Shewchuk
 Daniel Shewchuk, Canadian politician
 Jack Shewchuk (1917–1989), Canadian hockey player
 Jamie Shewchuk (born 1985), Canadian lacrosse player
 Jonathan Shewchuk, Canadian computer scientist
 Murphy O. Shewchuk, Canadian writer
 Tammy Shewchuk-Dryden (born 1977), Canadian ice hockey player

Szewczuk 
 Mirko Szewczuk (1919–1957), German cartoonist of Austrian-Ukrainian origin
 Stephen Szewczuk, Ukrainian-American army veteran
 Tomasz Szewczuk (born 1978), Polish footballer

Related surnames 
 Shevchenko
 Shvets
 Szewczyk

See also 
 

Surnames of Ukrainian origin
Ukrainian-language surnames
Occupational surnames